Giorgio Anglesio (13 April 1922 – 24 July 2007) was an Italian fencer. He won a gold medal in the team épée event at the 1956 Summer Olympics.

References

1922 births
2007 deaths
Sportspeople from Turin
Italian male fencers
Olympic fencers of Italy
Fencers at the 1956 Summer Olympics
Olympic gold medalists for Italy
Olympic medalists in fencing
Medalists at the 1956 Summer Olympics